David Alexander Hardy (September 29, 1877 – April 22, 1940) was a pitcher in Major League Baseball in the early twentieth century. He played for the Chicago Cubs of the National League in 1902 and 1903.

In July 1905, while playing for the minor league Troy Trojans, Hardy was shot in the chest in Troy, New York by a man who suspected him of having an affair with his wife. The bullet "lodged near his heart" but did not prevent him from playing in the minors until 1909.

References

External links

1877 births
1940 deaths
Binghamton Bingoes players
Buffalo Bisons (minor league) players
Canadian expatriate baseball players in the United States
Chicago Orphans players
Chicago Cubs players
Major League Baseball players from Canada
Major League Baseball pitchers
Toronto Canucks players
Hamilton Blackbirds players
St. Thomas Saints players
Toronto Maple Leafs (International League) players
Syracuse Stars (minor league baseball) players
Hamilton Hams players
Montreal Royals players
Troy Trojans (minor league) players
Atlanta Crackers players
Oakland Oaks (baseball) players
Scranton Miners players
Shooting survivors